Short Hill Mountain is a mountain ridge of the Blue Ridge Mountains in northwest Loudoun County, Virginia.

Geography 
Short Hill rises sharply from the Piedmont countryside of the Loudoun Valley, northwest of Purcellville. The mountain ridge extends northeast for approximately  before descending to the Hillsboro Gap, through which the North Fork of Catoctin Creek flows and the town of Hillsboro is located.

The portion of the mountain south of Hillsboro Gap is known as Signal Mountain for the Union Army signaling station located on its  summit during the American Civil War. North of the Potomac, the ridge continues as South Mountain in Maryland and Pennsylvania.

To the east of the mountain is the Catoctin Valley.

A small portion of Short Hill on its northwestern slope, along the Potomac, is owned by the National Park Service to preserve downriver views for Harpers Ferry National Historical Park. The rest of the mountain is in private hands and is by and large undeveloped.  The only road crossing of the mountain is Virginia State Route 9 at Hillsboro.

Geology 
The rocks underlying Short Hill are of the late Proterozoic and early Paleozoic eras.  The formation consists primarily of metabasalt greenstone deposited during the early Catoctin Formation and interspersed with metasedimentary phyllite, schist and breccia, which were deposited later.  The rocks were originally deposited contiguous with those of the Blue Ridge Mountains and uplifted together during the Grenville Orogeny.  The two ridges were later separated in the late Paleozoic era by movement along the Short Hill Fault, which runs along the western edge of the mountain.  During the Alleghenian Orogeny the rocks were pushed westward to their present location and uplifted once more.

Project Office 
Short Hill Mountain north of Hillsboro is home to one of several AT&T Corporation Project Offices, underground facilities constructed in the 1960s to provide redundant communications services. The Short Hill facility was renovated in the late 2010s and remains active.

References 

Mountain ranges of Virginia
Landforms of Loudoun County, Virginia
Ridges of Virginia
South Mountain Range (Maryland−Pennsylvania)